The Nordic Realm Party (NRP) was a Neo-Nazi political party in Sweden, founded in 1956 as the National Socialist Combat League of Sweden (Sveriges nationalsocialistiska kampförbund) by Göran Assar Oredsson. Oredsson was also the party leader except for a few years during the 1970s while he wrote his autobiography Prisat vare allt som gjort mig hårdare ("Blessed be everything that has made me a harder man"). During that time, his wife Vera Oredsson took on the role as party leader and became Sweden's first female party leader. 

The party had a group modelled after the German Sturmabteilung, called the Realm Action Group (RAG). whose members committed several political crimes. 
NRP published a few magazines, two being the "Nordic Struggle" and "The Sunwheel".  

In 1973, NRP ran for the Swedish parliament but only obtained a few hundred votes. In 2009 the party dissolved.

References

Defunct political parties in Sweden
Nationalist parties in Sweden
Neo-Nazi political parties in Europe
Political parties established in 1956
Neo-Nazism in Sweden
Political parties disestablished in 2009
1956 establishments in Sweden
2009 disestablishments in Sweden